Psidopala pennata is a moth in the family Drepanidae. It was described by Wileman in 1914. It is found in Taiwan.

References

Moths described in 1914
Thyatirinae
Moths of Taiwan